CKLD-FM is a Canadian radio station, broadcasting a soft adult contemporary format at 105.5 FM in Thetford Mines, Quebec. It shares the programming of sister station CFDA-FM in Victoriaville.

The stations air the same programming at all times, although both stations produce a portion of the shared broadcast schedule from separate studios. Their CHR sister station CFJO-FM also produces programming in both cities, although it serves the region from a single 100-kilowatt transmitter.

History
The station was launched on February 12, 1950 by Radio Mégantic. Broadcasting on 1230 AM, it was a private affiliate of the Radio-Canada network. François Labbé became president of the company in 1965.

The station moved to 1330 AM in 1976, and disaffiliated from Radio-Canada in 1979. The station moved to its current frequency in 1999.

In April 2014, Montreal-based Attraction Radio announced plans to acquire all of Réseau des Appalaches' stations, including CKLD-FM and CJLP-FM; the decision is currently awaiting CRTC approval.

Rebroadcasters

References

External links
Plaisir 105,5
 

Kld
Kld
Kld
Thetford Mines
Radio stations established in 1950
1950 establishments in Quebec